Xylotrechus undulatus is a species of beetle in the family Cerambycidae. It was described by Say in 1824.

References

Xylotrechus
Beetles described in 1824